The 68th Regiment Illinois Volunteer Infantry was an infantry regiment that served in the Union Army during the American Civil War.

Service
The 68th  Illinois Infantry was organized at Camp Butler, Illinois and mustered into Federal service on June 16, 1862, for a term of three months.  It served garrisons in the Alexandria, Virginia, area.

The regiment was mustered out on September 27, 1862.

Total strength and casualties
The regiment suffered 25 enlisted men who died of disease, for a total of 25 fatalities.

Commanders
Colonel Elias Stewart - mustered out with the regiment.

Notable members
 Pvt Paul Vandervoort, Company G - 11th Commander-in-Chief of the Grand Army of the Republic, 1882-1883

See also
List of Illinois Civil War Units
Illinois in the American Civil War

Notes

References
The Civil War Archive

Units and formations of the Union Army from Illinois
1862 establishments in Illinois
Military units and formations established in 1862
Military units and formations disestablished in 1862